Walter Bunbury was an Irish politician.

Bunbury was educated at Trinity College, Dublin.

Bunbury was MP for the Irish constituency of Thomastown from 1703 until 1713.

References

Alumni of Trinity College Dublin
Irish MPs 1703–1713
Members of the Parliament of Ireland (pre-1801) for County Wexford constituencies